Daniel Marinus Kan (or simply Dan Kan) (August 4, 1927 – August 4, 2013) was a Dutch mathematician working in category theory and homotopy theory. He was a prolific contributor to both fields for six decades, having authored or coauthored several dozen research papers and monographs.

Career
He received his Ph.D. at Hebrew University in 1955, under the direction of Samuel Eilenberg.  His students include Aldridge K. Bousfield, William Dwyer, Stewart Priddy, Emmanuel Dror Farjoun and Jeffrey H. Smith. He was an emeritus professor at the Massachusetts Institute of Technology where he taught from 1959, formally retiring in 1993.

Work
He played a role in the beginnings of modern homotopy theory similar to that of Saunders Mac Lane in homological algebra, namely the adroit and persistent application of categorical methods. His most famous work is the abstract formulation of the discovery of adjoint functors, which dates from 1958. The Kan extension is one of the broadest descriptions of a useful general class of adjunctions.

From the mid-1950s he made distinguished contributions to the theory of simplicial sets and simplicial methods in topology in general.  In recognition of this, fibrations in the usual closed model category structure on the category of simplicial sets are known as Kan fibrations, and the fibrant objects are known as Kan complexes.

Some of Kan's later work concerned model categories and other homotopical categories. Especially noteworthy are his work with Aldridge Bousfield on completions and homotopy limits, and his work with William Dwyer on simplicial localizations of relative categories.

See also
Dold–Kan correspondence
Kan extension

References

External links
 
 Kan memorial note at the MIT Mathematics Department

20th-century  Dutch mathematicians
Israeli expatriates in the United States
20th-century Israeli mathematicians
Hebrew University of Jerusalem alumni
Massachusetts Institute of Technology faculty
Topologists
1927 births
2013 deaths
Dutch emigrants to Israel